The Umayyad dynasty or Umayyads  were the ruling family of the Caliphate between 661 and 750 and later of al-Andalus (Islamic Spain) between 756 and 1031. In the pre-Islamic period, they were a prominent clan of the Meccan tribe of Quraysh, descended from Umayya ibn Abd Shams. Despite staunch opposition to the Islamic prophet Muhammad, the Umayyads embraced Islam before the latter's death in 632. Uthman, an early companion of Muhammad from the Umayyad clan, was the third Rashidun caliph, ruling in 644–656, while other members held various governorships. One of these governors, Mu'awiya I of Syria, opposed Caliph Ali in the First Muslim Civil War (656–661) and afterward founded the Umayyad Caliphate with its capital in Damascus. This marked the beginning of the Umayyad dynasty, the first hereditary dynasty in the history of Islam, and the only one to rule over the entire Islamic world of its time.

Umayyad authority was challenged in the Second Muslim Civil War, during which the Sufyanid line of Mu'awiya was replaced in 684 by Marwan I, who founded the Marwanid line of Umayyad caliphs, which restored the dynasty's rule over the Caliphate. The Umayyads drove on the early Muslim conquests, conquering North Africa, Hispania, Central Asia, and Sind, but the constant warfare exhausted the state's military resources, while Alid and Kharijite revolts and tribal rivalries weakened the state from within. Finally, in 750 the Abbasids overthrew Caliph Marwan II and massacred most of the family. One of the survivors, Abd al-Rahman, a grandson of Caliph Hisham ibn Abd al-Malik, escaped to Muslim Spain, where he founded the Emirate of Córdoba, which his descendant, Abd al-Rahman III, elevated to the status of a caliphate in 929. After a relatively short golden age, the Caliphate of Córdoba disintegrated into several independent taifa kingdoms in 1031, thus marking the political end of the Umayyad dynasty.

History

Pre-Islamic origins
The Umayyads, or Banu Umayya, were a clan of the larger Quraysh tribe, which dominated Mecca in the pre-Islamic era. The Quraysh derived prestige among the Arab tribes through their protection and maintenance of the Kaʿba, which at the time was regarded by the largely polytheistic Arabs across the Arabian Peninsula as their most sacred sanctuary. A Qurayshite leader, Abd Manaf ibn Qusayy, who based on his place in the genealogical tradition would have lived in the late 5th century, was charged with the maintenance and protection of the Kaʿba and its pilgrims. These roles passed to his sons Abd Shams, Hashim and others. Abd Shams was the father of Umayya, the eponymous progenitor of the Umayyads.

Umayya succeeded Abd Shams as the qa'id (wartime commander) of the Meccans. This position was likely an occasional political post whose holder oversaw the direction of Mecca's military affairs in times of war, instead of an actual field command. This early experience in military leadership proved instructive, as later Umayyads were known for possessing considerable political and military organizational skills. The historian Giorgio Levi Della Vida suggests that information in the early Arabic sources about Umayya, as with all the ancient progenitors of the tribes of Arabia, "be accepted with caution", but "that too great skepticism with regard to tradition would be as ill-advised as absolute faith in its statements". Della Vida asserts that since the Umayyads who appear at the beginning of Islamic history in the early 7th century were no later than third-generation descendants of Umayya, the latter's existence is highly plausible.

By circa 600, the Quraysh had developed trans-Arabian trade networks, organizing caravans to Syria in the north and Yemen in the south. The Banu Umayya and the Banu Makhzum, another prominent Qurayshite clan, dominated these trade networks. They developed economic and military alliances with the nomadic Arab tribes that controlled the northern and central Arabian desert expanses, gaining them a degree of political power in Arabia.

Opposition to Islam and adoption of Islam
When the Islamic prophet Muhammad, a member of the Banu Hashim, a Qurayshite clan related to the Banu Umayya through their shared ancestor, Abd Manaf, began his religious teachings in Mecca, he was opposed by most of the Quraysh. He found support from the inhabitants of Medina and relocated there with his followers in 622. The descendants of Abd Shams, including the Umayyads, were among the principal leaders of Qurayshite opposition to Muhammad. They superseded the Banu Makhzum, led by Abu Jahl, as a result of the heavy losses that the Banu Makhzum's leadership incurred fighting the Muslims at the Battle of Badr in 624. An Umayyad chief, Abu Sufyan, thereafter became the leader of the Meccan army that fought the Muslims under Muhammad at the battles of Uhud and the Trench.

Abu Sufyan and his sons, along with most of the Umayyads, embraced Islam toward the end of Muhammad's life, following the Muslim conquest of Mecca. To secure the loyalty of prominent Umayyad leaders, including Abu Sufyan, Muhammad offered them gifts and positions of importance in the nascent Muslim state. He installed another Umayyad, Attab ibn Asid ibn Abi al-Is, as the first governor of Mecca. Although Mecca retained its paramountcy as a religious center, Medina continued to serve as the political center of the Muslims. Abu Sufyan and the Banu Umayya relocated to the city to maintain their growing political influence.

Muhammad's death in 632 created a succession crisis, while nomadic tribes throughout Arabia that had embraced Islam defected from Medina's authority. Abu Bakr, one of Muhammad's oldest friends and an early convert to Islam, was elected caliph (paramount political and religious leader of the Muslim community). Abu Bakr showed favor to the Umayyads by awarding them a prominent role in the Muslim conquest of Syria. He appointed an Umayyad, Khalid ibn Sa'id ibn al-As, as commander of the expedition, but replaced him with other commanders, among whom was Abu Sufyan's son, Yazid. Abu Sufyan had already owned property and maintained trade networks in Syria.

Abu Bakr's successor, Caliph Umar, while actively curtailing the influence of the Qurayshite elite in favor of Muhammad's earlier supporters in the administration and military, did not disturb the growing foothold of Abu Sufyan's sons in Syria, which was all but conquered by 638. When Umar's overall commander over the province, Abu Ubayda ibn al-Jarrah, died in 639, he appointed Yazid governor of the Damascus, Palestine and Jordan districts of Syria. Yazid died shortly after and Umar installed his brother Mu'awiya in his place. Umar's exceptional treatment of Abu Sufyan's sons may have stemmed from his respect for the family, their burgeoning alliance with the powerful Banu Kalb tribe as a counterbalance to the influence of the Himyarite tribes who entered the Hims district during the conquest, or the lack of a suitable candidate at the time, particularly amid the plague of Amwas, which had already killed Abu Ubayda and Yazid.

Empowerment by Caliph Uthman
Caliph Umar died in 644 and was succeeded by Uthman ibn Affan, a wealthy Umayyad merchant, early convert to Islam, and son-in-law and close companion of Muhammad. Uthman initially kept his predecessors' appointees in their provincial posts, but gradually replaced many with Umayyads or his maternal kinsmen from the Banu Umayya's parent clan, the Banu Abd Shams. Mu'awiya, who had been appointed governor of Syria by Umar, retained his post. Two Umayyads, al-Walid ibn Uqba and Sa'id ibn al-As, were successively appointed to Kufa, one of the two main Arab garrisons and administrative centers in Iraq. Uthman's cousin, Marwan ibn al-Hakam, became his chief adviser. Although a prominent member of the clan, Uthman is not considered part of the Umayyad dynasty because he was chosen by consensus among the inner circle of Muslim leadership and never attempted to nominate an Umayyad as his successor. Nonetheless, as a result of Uthman's policies, the Umayyads regained a measure of the power they had lost after the Muslim conquest of Mecca.

The assassination of Uthman in 656 became a rallying cry for the Qurayshite opposition to his successor, Muhammad's cousin and son in-law Caliph Ali ibn Abi Talib of the Banu Hashim. The Qurayshite elite did not hold Ali responsible, but opposed his accession under the circumstances of Uthman's demise. Following their defeat at the Battle of the Camel near Basra, during which their leaders Talha ibn Ubayd Allah and Zubayr ibn al-Awwam, both potential contenders of the caliphate, died, the mantle of opposition to Ali was taken up chiefly by Mu'awiya. Initially, he refrained from openly claiming the caliphate, focusing instead on undermining Ali's authority and consolidating his position in Syria, all in the name of avenging Uthman's death. Mu'awiya and Ali, leading their respective Syrian and Iraqi supporters, fought to a stalemate at the Battle of Siffin in 657. It led to an indecisive arbitration, which weakened Ali's command over his partisans, while raising the stature of Mu'awiya as Ali's equal. As Ali was bogged down combating his former partisans, who became known as the Kharijites, Mu'awiya was recognized as caliph by his core supporters, the Syrian Arab tribes, in 659 or 660. When Ali was assassinated by a Kharijite in 661, Mu'awiya marched on Kufa, where he compelled Ali's son, Hasan, to cede caliphal authority and gained recognition from the region's Arab tribal nobility. As a result, Mu'awiya became widely recognized as caliph, though opposition by the Kharijites and some of Ali's loyalists persisted at a less consistent level.

Dynastic rule over the Caliphate

Sufyanid period

The reunification of the Muslim community under Mu'awiya's leadership marked the establishment of the Umayyad Caliphate. Based on the accounts of the traditional Muslim sources, Hawting writes that ... the Umayyads, leading representatives of those who had opposed the Prophet [Muhammad] until the latest possible moment, had within thirty years of his death reestablished their position to the extent that they were now at the head of the community which he had founded.

In contrast to Uthman's empowerment of the Umayyads, Mu'awiya's power did not rely on the clan and, with minor exceptions, he did not appoint Umayyads to the major provinces or his court in Damascus. He largely limited their influence to Medina, where most of the Umayyads remained headquartered. The loss of political power left the Umayyads of Medina resentful of Mu'awiya, who may have become wary of the political ambitions of the much larger Abu al-As branch of the clan—to which Uthman had belonged—under the leadership of Marwan ibn al-Hakam. Mu'awiya attempted to weaken the clan by provoking internal divisions. Among the measures taken was the replacement of Marwan from the governorship of Medina in 668 with another leading Umayyad, Sa'id ibn al-As. The latter was instructed to demolish Marwan's house, but refused. Marwan was restored in 674 and also refused Mu'awiya's order to demolish Sa'id's house. Mu'awiya appointed his own nephew, al-Walid ibn Utba ibn Abi Sufyan, in Marwan's place in 678.

In 676, Mu'awiya installed his son, Yazid I, as his successor. The move was unprecedented in Muslim politics—earlier caliphs had been elected by popular support in Medina or by the consultation of the senior companions of Muhammad. Mu'awiya's Umayyad kinsmen in Medina, including Marwan and Sa'id, accepted Mu'awiya's decision, albeit disapprovingly. The principle opposition emanated from Husayn ibn Ali, Abd Allah ibn al-Zubayr, Abd Allah ibn Umar and Abd al-Rahman ibn Abi Bakr, all prominent Medina-based sons of earlier caliphs or close companions of Muhammad. 

Yazid acceded in 680 and three years later faced a revolt by the people of Medina and Ibn al-Zubayr in Mecca. Yazid's cousin, Uthman ibn Muhammad ibn Abi Sufyan, and the Umayyads residing in Medina, led by Marwan, were expelled. Yazid dispatched his Syrian army to reassert his authority in the Hejaz and relieve his kinsmen. The Umayyads of Medina joined the Syrians in the assault against the rebels in Medina and defeated them at the Battle of al-Harra. The Syrians proceeded to besiege Mecca, but withdrew upon the death of Yazid. Afterward, Ibn al-Zubayr declared himself caliph and expelled the Umayyads of the Hejaz a second time. They relocated to Palmyra or Damascus, where Yazid's son and successor, Mu'awiya II, ruled at a time when most provinces of the Caliphate discarded Umayyad authority.

Early Marwanid period
After Mu'awiya II died in 684, the junds of Palestine, Homs and Qinnasrin recognized Ibn al-Zubayr, while loyalist tribes in Damascus and al-Urdunn scrambled to nominate an Umayyad as caliph. The Banu Kalb, lynchpins of Sufyanid rule, nominated Yazid's surviving sons Khalid and Abd Allah, but they were considered young and inexperienced by most of the other loyalist tribes. Marwan volunteered his candidacy and gained the consensus of the tribes, acceding to the caliphate at a summit in Jabiya in 684. Per the arrangement agreed by the tribes, Marwan would be succeeded by Khalid, followed by Amr al-Ashdaq, the son of Sa'id ibn al-As. Marwan and the allied tribes, led by the Kalb, defeated Ibn al-Zubayr's supporters in Syria, led by the Qurayshite governor of Damascus, al-Dahhak ibn Qays al-Fihri, and the Qays tribes of Qinnasrin, and afterward retook Egypt. Before his death in 685, Marwan voided the succession arrangement, appointing his sons Abd al-Malik and Abd al-Aziz, in that order, instead. Abd al-Aziz was made governor of Egypt and another son, Muhammad was appointed to defeat the Qays tribes of the Jazira. Soon after Abd al-Malik acceded, while he was away on a military campaign, he faced an attempted coup in Damascus by Amr al-Ashdaq. Abd al-Malik
suppressed the revolt and personally executed his kinsman. By 692, he defeated Ibn al-Zubayr, who was killed, and restored Umayyad authority across the Caliphate. 

Abd al-Malik concentrated power into the hands of the Umayyad dynasty. At one point, his brothers or sons held nearly all governorships of the provinces and Syria's districts. Abd al-Aziz was retained over Egypt until his death shortly before Abd al-Malik's in 705. He was replaced by Abd al-Malik's son Abdallah. Abd al-Malik appointed his son Sulayman over Palestine, following stints there by his uncle Yahya ibn al-Hakam and brother Aban ibn Marwan. In Iraq, he appointed his brother Bishr over Kufa and a distant cousin, Khalid ibn Abdallah ibn Khalid ibn Asid, in Basra, before combining both cities under the governorship of his trusted general al-Hajjaj ibn Yusuf. Abd al-Malik's court in Damascus was filled with far more Umayyads than under his Sufyanid predecessors, a result of the clan's exile to the city from Medina. He maintained close ties with the Sufyanids through marital relations and official appointments, such as according Yazid's son Khalid a prominent role in the court and army and wedding to him his daughter A'isha. Abd al-Malik also married Khalid's sister Atika, who became his favorite and most influential wife.

After his brother Abd al-Aziz's death, Abd al-Malik designated his eldest son, al-Walid I, his successor, to be followed by his second eldest, Sulayman. Al-Walid acceded in 705. He kept Sulayman as governor of Palestine, while appointing his sons to the other junds of Syria, with Abd al-Aziz over Damascus, al-Abbas over Homs and Umar over Jordan, as well as giving them command roles in the frontier wars against the Byzantines in Anatolia. He retired his uncle Muhammad ibn Marwan from the Jazira, installing his half-brother Maslama there instead. Al-Walid I's attempt to void his father's succession arrangements by replacing Sulayman with his son Abd al-Aziz failed and Sulayman acceded in 715. Rather than nominating his own sons or brothers, Sulayman appointed his cousin, Umar II, the son of Abd al-Aziz ibn Marwan, as his successor. While the traditional sources present the choice as related to the persuasion of the court theologian, Raja ibn Haywa, it may have been related to Umar II's seniority and his father's previous position as Marwan I's second successor. The family of Abd al-Malik protested the move, but were coerced into a compromise whereby Yazid II, the son of Abd al-Malik and Atika, would follow Umar II.

Rule over al-Andalus

Founding of Emirate of Cordoba and Umayyad settlement
A survivor of the Abbasid massacres of the Umayyad family, Abd al-Rahman ibn Mu'awiya (better known as Abd al-Rahman I), a grandson of Caliph Hisham, made his way to al-Andalus, where the mawali of the Umayyads helped him establish a foothold in the province. Once he established the Emirate of Cordoba in 756, he invited other Marwanids, who were keeping a low profile under Abbasid rule, to settle in the Emirate. He was quoted by al-Maqqari as stating, "among the many [favors] bestowed on us by the Almighty ... is his allowing us to collect in this country our kindred and relatives, and enabling us to give them a share in this empire". Among those who heeded his call were his brother al-Walid and the latter's son al-Mughira, his first cousin Ubayd al-Salam ibn Yazid ibn Hisham, and his nephew Ubayd Allah ibn Aban ibn Mu'awiya. Others who arrived included Juzayy ibn Abd al-Aziz and Abd al-Malik ibn Umar (both grandsons of Marwan I) from Egypt, Bishr ibn Marwan's son Abd al-Malik from Iraq, and al-Walid I's grandson Habib ibn Abd al-Malik, who had escaped the massacre of Nahr Abi Futrus. All the Umayyad immigrants were granted estates, stipends, command roles in the army, and provincial offices. While all the emirs, and later caliphs, of al-Andalus were direct descendants of Abd al-Rahman I, the families of Abd al-Malik ibn Umar (the Marwani clan) and Habib ibn Abd al-Malik (the Habibi clan) both became prominent at the provincial, military, judicial and cultural levels into the 10th century.

Branches
In the early 7th century, prior to their conversion to Islam, the main branches of the Umayyads were the A'yas and the Anabisa. The former grouped the descendants of Umayya's sons Abu al-As, al-As, Abu al-Is and al-Uways, all of whose names shared the same or similar root, hence the eponymous label, 'A'yas'. The Anabisa, which is the plural form of Anbasa, a common name in this branch of the clan, gathered the descendants of Umayya's sons Harb, Abu Harb, Abu Sufyan Anbasa, Sufyan, Amr and Umayya's possibly adopted son, Abu Amr Dhakwan.

Two of the sons of Abu al-As, Affan and al-Hakam, each fathered future caliphs, Uthman and Marwan I, respectively. From the latter's descendants, known as the Marwanids, came the Umayyad caliphs of Damascus who reigned successively between 684 and 750, and then the Cordoba-based emirs and caliphs of Muslim Spain, who held office until 1031. Other than those who had escaped to al-Andalus, most of the Marwanids were killed in the Abbasid purges of 750. However, a number of them settled in Egypt and Iran, where one of them, Abu al-Faraj al-Isfahani, authored the famous source of Arab history, the Kitab al-Aghani, in the 10th century. Uthman, the third Rashidun caliph, who ruled between 644 and 656, left several descendants, some of whom served political posts under the Umayyad caliphs. From the Abu al-Is line came the politically important family of Asid ibn Abi al-Is, whose members served military and gubernatorial posts under various Rashidun and Umayyad caliphs. The al-As line produced Sa'id ibn al-As, who served as one of Uthman's governors in Kufa.

The most well-known family of the Anabisa branch was that of Harb's son Abu Sufyan Sakhr. From his descendants, the Sufyanids, came Mu'awiya I, who founded the Umayyad Caliphate in 661, and Mu'awiya I's son and successor, Yazid I. Sufyanid rule ceased with the death of the latter's son Mu'awiya II in 684, though Yazid's other sons, Khalid and Abd Allah, continued to play political roles, and the former was credited as the founder of Arabic alchemy. Abd Allah's son Abu Muhammad Ziyad al-Sufyani, meanwhile, led a rebellion against the Abbasids in 750, but was ultimately slain. Abu Sufyan's other sons were Yazid, who preceded Mu'awiya I as governor of Syria, Amr, Anbasa, Muhammad and Utba. Only the last two left progeny. The other important family of the Anabisa were the descendants of Abu Amr, known as the Banu Abi Mu'ayt. Abu Amr's grandson Uqba ibn Abu Mu'ayt was captured and executed on Muhammad's orders during the Battle of Badr for his previously harsh incitement against the prophet. Uqba's son, al-Walid, served as Uthman's governor in Kufa for a brief period. The Banu Abi Mu'ayt made Iraq and Upper Mesopotamia their home.

List of Umayyad rulers

Syria-based Umayyad caliphs

Umayyad emirs and caliphs of Córdoba

Genealogical chart of Umayyad rulers

See also
Umayyad architecture
Umayyad Mosque

References

Sources

|-

|-

|-

|-

|-

 
Muslim family trees
Arab dynasties
Muslim dynasties